Colectica is a suite of programs for use in documenting official statistics and specifying statistical surveys using open standards that enable researchers, archivists, and programmers to perform:

 questionnaire design
 automatic programming for computer-assisted telephone interviewing systems
 data entry, retrieval, and management
 statistical analysis
 microdata documentation and management
 applications development
 data warehousing
 metadata standards creation such as Data Documentation Initiative

Colectica is currently in use by a variety of university survey research groups, longitudinal studies, National Statistics Offices, data archives, and commercial survey research organizations.

History 
Colectica was originally funded in part by the NIH National Institute on Aging to explore automatic documentation of computer assisted surveys. This grant saw the creation of metadata extraction and flowchart creation tools for CASES, Blaise, and CSPro survey instrument source code. The grant also partially funded the creation of a questionnaire specification content area in the Data Documentation Initiative's DDI Lifecycle metadata standard. The functionality of these tools, originally named SurveyViz, is now bundled with the Colectica Designer and based on the DDI standard.

The NIH funds many long-running longitudinal studies that have collected vast amounts of data, which due to their design require detailed documentation and organization. In 2011, the NIH National Institute on Aging provided further funding to add longitudinal data management functionality to Colectica to enable documenting the complex study designs.

See also 
 Data Documentation Initiative
 Official statistics
 Longitudinal study

External links 
 Colectica

References 

C Sharp software
Statistical survey software
Metadata registry
ISO/IEC 11179